Goose Creek is a stream in Clay County in the U.S. state of Kentucky.
It is one of two tributaries at the head of the South Fork of the Kentucky River, the other being the Red Bird River.

Tributaries and post offices 
There have been 48 postoffices on Goose Creek and its tributaries (including the postoffice at Manchester) up to the turn of the 21st century.

The tributaries are:
 Little Goose Creek whose post offices and tributaries are in its article
 Horse Creek whose post offices and tributaries are in its article
 Wildcat Creek, location of Wildcat post office
 Laurel Creek whose post offices and tributaries are in its article
 Collins Creek whose post offices and tributaries are in its article
 Grannies Branch
 Martins Creek whose post offices and tributaries are in its article
 Lockards Creek was named Lockhart Creek on late 19th and early 20th century geological survey maps and was probably so named for the descendants of Patrick Lockhart, owner of a  military land grant on Goose in the 1780s; but was rather sometimes named Whites Branch after its first settlers Hugh and Catherine White from Tennessee
 Schoolhouse Branch
Rocky Branch
 Beech Creek whose post offices and tributaries are in its article, and is also a wildlife area
 Jacks Branch
 Island Creek
 Mud Lick, known in the 19th century as Timbertree Creek
 Mill Creek
 Otter Creek
 Grubb Branch, previously known as Sams Branch

In the 19th century the head part of the creek downstream to the confluence with Collins Creek was considered to be its East Fork, but is now considered to be Goose Creek proper.

On minor creeks 
Hollingsworth postoffice was established on 1901-10-15 by postmaster William Hollansworth on the Right Fork of Island Creek to serve Brooks.
Hollansworth wanted to use the name Brooks but it would have clashed with an existing postoffice in Bullitt County.
It operated to April 1905, and after a short hiatus was reëstablished by Elbert Hornsby on 1907-10-22 to run to September 1912.

Botto postoffice was established on 1928-01-14 by postmaster Docia Morgan Asher, whose first choice of name had been May.
It was 1 mile up Billys Branch from the branch mouth.
It closed in July 1964.

Otter Creek had a postoffice named Ogle.

Along Goose Creek itself 
Hensley postoffice was established on 1905-10-11 by postmaster John H. Roberts with the name Hacker, which he renamed on 1906-01-11 to Hensley.
It closed in 1965.
Both were the names of prominent families in the county, respectively descendants of Massie Hacker and James and Nancy Hensley.

Treadway postoffice, probably at the mouth of Jacks Branch. ran from 1887-07-21 to 1894-05-28 named for, and with, postmasters John H. Treadway and Peter R. Treadway.
Postmaster Elisha B. Treadway established Bernice postoffice at the same place on 1907-11-15.
It moved a mile upstream along the branch some time before 1939, and closed in 1955.
It was named for his daughter, he having submitted the names of both daughters (the other being Ethel), his sister Myrtle, and another family member Ora as choices of name when applying.

Seeley postoffice was established on 1898-02-10 by, and named for, postmaster Peasant D. Seeley and ran to January 1908.

Lockards postoffice was established on 1932-10-29 by postmaster H. W. Short, just below the mouth of Lockards Creek/Whites Branch, and closed in 1934.
Short's first choice of name was White Hall.

The precise location along Goose of Disappoint postoffice, established on 1883-01-19 but swiftly closed on 1883-02-15 by Perry Jarvis, is not known.
Jarvis tried, and failed, to establish another postoffice in 1899 named Remedy, again location unknown.

Lipps postoffice was established at the mouth of Otter Creek in December 1901 by William O.B. Lipps, a lawyer born in 1869, but was rescinded in July 1902.
It was successfully reëstablished on 1903-05-27 by postmaster Robert Woods, to close in October 1935.
Some time before December 1934 it had been relocated upstream to the mouth of Mud Lick branch.

Smallwood postoffice was established on 1876-08-03 by postmasters Jack Wages and John Lewis, and closed on 1879-02-13.
It was named for a Smallwood family of pioneers on Goose, and located just downstream of Grubb Branch and 3 miles upstream of Mill Branch.

Eros postoffice was established on 1899-09-01 by postmaster Christopher Levi Harbon, and closed in 1902.
It was just down from the head of Goose Creek.

Goose Rock
Goose Rock postoffice was established on 1891-08-11 by postmaster Charles W. Sevier.
It was located at several points along Goose Creek, starting with across the creek from the mouth of Schoolhouse Branch, then to the mouth of Rocky Branch, then up Rocky Branch, then to Grannies Branch, then to a place named The Cut (near its original location), and by the turn of the 21st century at the mouth of Grannies Branch.

The area encompassed by all of these locations and served by the postoffice, includes a Goose Rock consolidated school.

The name according to oral tradition supposedly originates with a goose making its nest on a rock in the middle of the creek.
However, there actually is not such a rock to be found, and possibly the nest, if there ever was one, was on a bluff overlooking the postoffice.

Bright's Shade
Brightshade post office was on the creek itself at various locations through its history.

Originally Bright's Shade was the home of husband and wife Wiley (born 1838) and Ester Bright, and used as a stopping point for people travelling the creek.
Coming from Knox County, they had settled at the mouth of Otter Creek on Goose Creek in 1862.
Postmaster Milton L. Albertson took the name for the postoffice that he established there on 1883-08-06, although the USPS removed the possessive and combined the two words into one.

It was located at that and several other points along Goose Creek during its lifetime through to 1984, moving progressively upstream.
In 1888 it was a mile upstream, by 1898 a further  at the mouth Mud Lick, and by 1906 reaching its final location four miles upstream at the mouth of tributary Mill Creek.

It was a rural branch from 1968 onwards.

Other localities along the creek 
Goose Creek Salt Works

See also
List of rivers of Kentucky

Cross-reference

Sources

Further reading 

 
 

Rivers of Kentucky
Rivers of Clay County, Kentucky